Tom Hooker or Thomas Barbey (born Thomas Beecher Hooker on November 18, 1957) is an American singer and photographer. He was the voice and one of the songwriters behind most songs for popular Italo disco artist Den Harrow. The 2018 documentary Dons of Disco covers Hooker's involvement in the Den Harrow project.

History
Barbey, best known as Tom Hooker, was brought to Europe when he was six months old. At the age of ten, he started his musical career as a drummer. At 13, he created his first band. At 15, he first appeared in public at a concert as a drummer/singer. He studied languages in Switzerland.

Music
In 1980, he moved to Italy, where he was discovered by Italian producers. His first hit was "Flip Over", b/w the track "We Can Start It All Over Again". He had his first major success in 1986 with "Looking for Love". His later work included collaborations with several other artists and producers, including Eddy Huntington, for whom he provided several lyrics and backing vocals, including those for the Europe-wide hit "U.S.S.R.".

By 1994, he moved to America to marry his American girlfriend and pursue his longtime hobby, photography.

Den Harrow
Hooker co-wrote and sang lead vocals on the first two Den Harrow albums, backing vocals on the third album and co-wrote many subsequent Den Harrow songs under the name T. Beecher. When Hooker was credited for vocals at all, it was only for background vocals, as it was the producer's intention to have the lip-synching model Stefano Zandri as the public face of the project.

In 2010, Tom Hooker recorded and published on YouTube a press conference-style video in which Hooker, flanked by Den Harrow co-producer Miki Chierigato, states and demonstrates that he was the vocalist on most of the Den Harrow records, and in which he accuses Stefano Zandri of continuing to publicly lip synch to those recordings. He also states that Zandri made threats and insults against Hooker and his family on Facebook for exposing the vocal inauthenticity of the Den Harrow recordings. Hooker asserts that Zandri no longer has permission to publicly lip sync to Den Harrow recordings that use Tom Hooker's voice.

Photography
In 1994, Hooker left the music scene to move to America to marry Suzanne Berquist. He eventually moved to Los Angeles and changed his name to Thomas Barbey, his mother's maiden name. He began a career as a visual artist, creating surreal photomontages. He currently exhibits in galleries in many countries around the world.

Revival
In October 2010, Hooker collaborated with his longtime musical colleague and fellow composer, Miki Chieregato, to produce and release a brand new single and video, "Change Your Mind". This collaboration marks the return to the roots of the same production team that was responsible for all of the initial Den Harrow and Tom Hooker output between 1985 and 1988. In 2011, Hooker released a new recording and music video of the Den Harrow track "Future Brain", which features himself.

Since 2014, Tom Hooker and Miki Chieregato have been issuing Den Harrow-esque tracks under the name of Tam Harrow.

Discography

Albums
1980: Tom Hooker
1986: Only One
1988: Bad Reputation
1992: Fighting for Our Love
2011: Unconditional Love
2015: Incredible Idiot (as Tam Harrow - a parody on Den Harrow)
2017: Back in Time
2018: No Time to Say Goodbye
2020: Together (as Tom Hooker & Tam Harrow)
2022: Rollerskating Hooker Zombies on Heroin

Singles
1980: "Flip Over"/"We Can Start It All Over Again"
1981: "Toccami"/"Go Today"
1981: "I Want to Love"
1982: "Dove Andiamo"/"Try Me"
1982: "With Your Body"
1983: "Come Back Home"
1984: "Give It to Me"
1984: "Indian Girl"/"Love Attack"
1984: "Real Men" (12")
1985: "Cry"/"Don't Forget (To Buy This Record)"
1986: "Help Me"
1986: "Looking for Love"
1986: "Swiss Boy" (under the pseudonym Lou Sern)
1986: "Help Me"
1987: "Atlantis" (12")
1988: "Feeling Okay" (12")
1988: "No More Heaven" (12")
1990: "Living in the Sunshine" (7")
1991: "Sex-O-Phone & Funk Guitar" (12")
1994: "Runaway" (12")
2010: "Change Your Mind"
2012: "No Elevation" (with Miki Chieregato)
2014: "Illusions/Nobody Loves Me"
2016: "Tell Me"
2016: "My Russian Lady Night"
2017: "I Want You Tonight" (with Linda Jo Rizzo)
2017: "King of the World"
2017: "Find a Way and a Time"
2017: "Rain" (with Miki Chieregato)
2020: "You And I" (with Tam Harrow)
2020: "With Our Love" (with Bad Boys Blue and Scarlett)

Singles as Tam Harrow
2014: "Idiot"
2014: "Incredible" 
2014: "Kept Boy"
2014: "You DJ You Rock"
2014: "Fixation"
2015: "Vodka Kaboom"
2015: "Swiss Cows" (feat. Lou Sern)
2016: "Go to Mexico"
2018: "No Time to Say Goodbye"
2018: "Big Boys Don't Cry"
2019: "Dancing to the Night"
2020: "Your Love Is So Nice"
2020: "Latin Lover"

Collaborations
2021: "A Sailor from the Moon" (feat. Lord, Begüm Günceler)
2021: "In the sign of destiny" (feat. Lord, Peter Rafelson)
2021: "Keep on rolling" (feat. Lord)

References

External links
Tom Hooker interview
Thomas Barbey official site

1957 births
Living people
American Italo disco musicians
Italian-language singers
American male singers
Musicians from Greenwich, Connecticut
Singers from Los Angeles